Virgil Smith may refer to:

 Virgil C. Smith (born 1947), American judge and former member of the Michigan House of Representatives and Michigan Senate
 Virgil Smith, Jr. (born 1979), his son, American politician and member of the Michigan Senate